Maridi County is an administrative area in Western Equatoria, South Sudan. It borders Mvolo County to the north-east, Mundri West County to the east and Ibba County to the west. It also borders Lakes State (Wulu County) to the north-west, Central Equatoria State (Yei County) to the south-east and the Democratic Republic of Congo to the south-west. The major ethnic groups in Maridi County are Baka, Mundu, Avukaya, Zande, Moro Kodo, and Wetu.

References
Western Equatoria
Counties of South Sudan